Ferman is a German surname and a Turkish given name. The surname is a variation of Fehrmann, meaning "ferryman". The given name is derived from the Turkish word for "edict", borrowed from the Persian Farmaan or Fermaan (Persian: فرمان farmân).

Notable people with the name include:

Surname:
Edward L. Ferman (born 1937), American writer and publisher
James Ferman (1930–2002), American film and theatre director
Joseph W. Ferman (1906–1974), Lithuanian-American science fiction publisher
Risa Vetri Ferman (born 1965), American lawyer

Given name:
Ferman Akgül (born 1979), Turkish songwriter
Fermán Cienfuegos, Salvadoran communist
Farman Salmanov, Soviet geologist

German-language surnames
Turkish masculine given names